The Second Battle of Donaldsonville was an American Civil War battle took place on June 28, 1863 in Ascension Parish, Louisiana.

Background
On June 28, 1863, Confederate Brig. Gen. Jean Alfred Mouton ordered Brig. Gen. Tom Green's and Col. James Patrick Major's brigades to take Donaldsonville, Louisiana. The Union had built Fort Butler, which the Rebels had to take before occupying the town.

Forces engaged
The Union forces were the Fort Butler Garrison: two companies of the 28th Maine Volunteer Infantry and some convalescents from various regiments. The Confederate forces were Tom Green's Texas Brigade and Colonel James Patrick Major's Texas Brigade.

Battle

On the night of June 27, Green, within a mile and a half of the fort, began moving troops ahead to attack. The attack started soon after midnight, and the Confederates quickly surrounded the fort and began passing through the various obstructions. Those troops attacking along the levee came to a ditch, unknown to them, too wide to cross, that saved the day for the Union garrison. A Union gunboat, USS Princess Royal, came to the garrison's aid also and began shelling the attackers. Futile Confederate assaults continued for some time but they eventually ceased their operations and retired.

Result
This point on the Mississippi River remained in Union hands and many other Mississippi River towns were occupied by the Yankees: the Confederates could harass but not eliminate these Union enclaves.

Opposing Forces

Union

 28th Maine Volunteer Infantry Regiment
 Company C
 Company F
 Company G
 Misc. Convalescents and Freedmen 
  - Cmdr Melancthon Brooks Woolsey
  - Lt. Cmdr. A.W. Weaver

Confederate

 3rd Texas Cavalry Regiment (Arizona Brigade)            
 3rd Texas Cavalry Regiment - Col Joseph Phillips
 4th Texas Cavalry Regiment - Col W. P. Hardeman
 5th Texas Cavalry Regiment - Maj. Denman Shannon
 7th Texas Cavalry Regiment - Col. Philemon T. Herbert
 1st Texas Partisan Rangers - Col. Walter P. Lane
 2nd Texas Partisan Rangers - Lt. Col R. P. Crump
 1st Louisiana Regular Battery - Lt. O. Semmes

References

Taylor's Operations in West Louisiana (American Civil War)
Battles of the Lower Seaboard Theater and Gulf Approach of the American Civil War
Union victories of the American Civil War
Donaldsonville II
Battle of Donaldsonville II
Battle
1863 in Louisiana
June 1863 events